Elections to North Warwickshire District Council were held on Thursday 5 May 2011.

A total of 35 seats were up for election, all councillors from all wards. The previous election produced a majority for the Conservative Party.

Election result
These elections saw Labour narrowly win with a majority of just one seat but losing the overall popular vote to the Conservatives. The number of close results in so many wards perhaps is the reason for this.

The Conservatives lost four seats at these elections, in the following wards.

 Arley and Whitacre, where Labour gained the second seat, and also came 18 votes short of winning the third seat.
 Atherstone Central, where Labour retained the seat they won at the last council elections in 2007 and additionally retained their March 2009 by-election gain of the one Conservative seat in the ward.
 Coleshill North, where Labour gained the first seat, while coming 17 votes short of winning the other seat. This was the first time Labour won a seat in this ward since 1995.
 Polesworth West, where Labour gained the Conservative seat, while retaining the seat Labour held in 2003 and 2007.

The number of seats could have flipped the other way if the Conservatives managed to have won in Atherstone North, where both of the Conservative candidates received 522 votes, which was 32 votes behind taking the second seat in that ward, which bizarrely wasn't one of the four seats the Conservatives lost at these elections. Even more astonishingly, Atherstone North had never elected a Conservative councillor in the entirety of the borough council's existence, and would not do so until the following elections in 2015, which coincided with the North Warwickshire parliamentary constituency, which incorporates all of the North Warwickshire borough except for 2 wards (Arley & Whitacre and Hartshill), as well as five Nuneaton and Bedworth wards (Bede, Exhall, Heath, Poplar, and Slough) being held by the Conservatives with an increased majority at the general election on the same day.

Ward results

References

2011 English local elections
2011
2010s in Warwickshire